Clark Township, Ohio, may refer to:

Clark Township, Brown County, Ohio
Clark Township, Clinton County, Ohio
Clark Township, Coshocton County, Ohio
Clark Township, Holmes County, Ohio

Ohio township disambiguation pages